The following lists events that happened during 1812 in Chile.

Incumbents
Royal Governor of Chile (in opposition): José Antonio Pareja (12 December-)

Supreme Provisional Authority: José Miguel Carrera (-January 8), Patriot

President of the Provisional Government Junta:  José Miguel Carrera (January 8-April 8), Patriot, José Santiago Portales (April 8-August 6), Patriot, Pedro José Prado Jaraquemada (August 6-December 6), Patriot, José Miguel Carrera Verdugo (December 6-), Patriot

Events

February
13 February - The Aurora de Chile prints its first issue.

October
27 October - The Chilean constitutional referendum, 1812 is held.

November
10 November - The Senate of Chile first meets.

Births

September
 September 12 – Carmen Quiroga de Urmeneta, philanthropist (d. 1897)

Date unknown
 Vicente Quesada (d. 1877)

Deaths

References 

 
Chile
Chile